Sturisomatichthys dariense is a species of armored catfish endemic to Panama where it occurs in the Tuira River basin.

References

Sturisoma
Fish of Central America
Fish of Panama
Fish described in 1913